The Darmstädter und Nationalbank (short form Danat-Bank) was a German bank.

History 
The Darmstädter und Nationalbank was formed in 1922 from the merger of the Bank für Handel und Industrie (Darmstadt) and the Nationalbank für Deutschland.

The Darmstädter Bank für Handel und Industrie (often called Darmstädter Bank) was founded as the Bank für Handel und Industrie by Gustav von Mevissen and Abraham Oppenheim with a capital of 25 million guilders and modelled after the French bank Crédit Mobilier. It received a banking concession on 2 April 1853. It was thus the second universal bank in Germany founded as a company limited by shares (Aktiengesellschaft), after the A. Schaaffhausen'scher Bankverein. In 1873 the bank moved its headquarters to Berlin, having opened a branch there in 1871. Further branches were opened in Stettin (1900), Hannover (1901), Düsseldorf, Munich and Nuremberg (1910). In 1913, the Darmstädter Bank took over the Breslauer Disconto-Bank, and during the inflation years between 1918 and 1921, it opened many more branches across Germany.

Danat-Bank 

In 1920/1921, the Darmstädter Bank für Handel und Industrie and the Nationalbank für Deutschland formed the bank union Darmstädter-Nationalbank Berlin. Both banks assumed a joint guarantee of capital and reserves of over 1 billion marks. The merger was fully completed in 1922, resulting in one of the largest commercial banks in Germany. By 1931 Danatbank had become the second largest bank in Germany, when it suffered a run which started around 17 June due to rumours of the insolvency of the Norddeutsche Wollkämmerei & Kammgarnspinnerei (North German Wool and Worsted Yarn Spinning Works), finally going bankrupt on 13 July 1931. It was thus one of the most prominent victims of deflation in Germany during the Great Depression.

The collapse of Danatbank triggered a loss of confidence in the German banking system, and loosed a wave of withdrawals from all other banks beginning the German Banking Crisis. In reaction, the government announced a Bank Holiday starting on 13 July, imposed further capital controls and forced the merger of Danatbank with Dresdner Bank.

Well known figures 
Well-known bankers of the Danatbank and its predecessors are (in alphabetical order):
 Siegmund Bodenheimer (Manager of Darmstädter Bank 1910–1922, shareholder 1922–1931)
 Bernhard Dernburg (Manager of Darmstädter Bank 1901–1906)
 Jakob Goldschmidt (Shareholder 1922–1931)
 Johannes Kaempf (Branch director of the Bank für Handel und Industrie in Berlin and Reichstags-President)
 Hjalmar Schacht (Shareholder 1922–1923)
 Georg von Simson (Shareholder bis 1929)
 Richard Witting (Director (1902–1910) and board member (1911–1922) of the Nationalbank, board member of Danatbank)

References

Further reading

External links 
 Documents about Danatbank in the German National Library
 

1931 disestablishments in Germany
Defunct banks of Germany
Banks established in 1922
Dresdner Bank